Beth Run is a tributary of Bowman Creek in Luzerne County, Pennsylvania, in the United States. The surficial geology along it consists of Wisconsinan Till and alluvium. The stream's watershed is designated as a High-Quality Coldwater Fishery and a Migratory Fishery and the stream is Class A Wild Trout Waters.

Course
Beth Run begins at the head of a valley in Ross Township. It flows east-northeast for several tenths of a mile before turning northeast for several tenths of a mile and entering Lake Township. Here, the stream receives an unnamed tributary from the right and turns north for several tenths of a mile, its valley widening considerably. At the end of the valley, the stream reaches its confluence with Bowman Creek.

Hydrology

Geography and geology

The surficial geology along most of the length of Beth Run consists of a till known as Wisconsinan Till. In the stream's upper reaches, alluvium is present as well and some of the Wisconsinan Till is underlain by glacial lake clays. There is also a patch of Wisconsinan Bouldery Till at the headwaters; it is rich in boulders. The surficial geology along the sides of the stream's valley includes bedrock consisting of sandstone and shale.

Watershed
The stream is entirely within the United States Geological Survey quadrangle of Sweet Valley.

The entire length of Beth Run is on public land that is open to access.

History
Beth Run was entered into the Geographic Names Information System on August 2, 1979. Its identifier in the Geographic Names Information System is 1169332.

In the 1970s, the Pennsylvania Game Commission was attempting to purchase a  tract of land in the vicinity of Beth Run to add to Pennsylvania State Game Lands Number 57. The Pennsylvania Game Commission also once requested a permit to construct an aluminum box culvert bridge over the stream with the purpose of providing access to the southern parts of Pennsylvania State Game Lands Number 57 for tree salvage cutting.

Biology
The drainage basin of Beth Run is designated as a High-Quality Coldwater Fishery and a Migratory Fishery. Wild trout naturally reproduce in the stream from its headwaters downstream to its mouth. It is classified by the Pennsylvania Fish and Boat Commission as Class A Wild Trout Waters for brook trout from its headwaters downstream to its mouth.

See also
Butternut Run, next tributary of Bowman Creek going downstream
Wolf Run (Bowman Creek), next tributary of Bowman Creek going upstream
List of rivers of Pennsylvania
List of tributaries of Bowman Creek

References

Rivers of Luzerne County, Pennsylvania
Tributaries of Bowman Creek
Rivers of Pennsylvania